The 4:44 Tour was a concert tour by Jay-Z, in support of his thirteenth studio album 4:44 (2017). The tour began  in Anaheim at the Honda Center on October 27, 2017, and concluded on December 21, 2017, in Inglewood at The Forum. Vic Mensa was the opening act for the whole tour.

Jay Z's North American run of his 4:44 Tour grossed $48,698,354 over the course of 32 dates. 426,441 tickets were sold in that span, with about $1.5 million grossed per show.

Background and development 
On July 10, 2017, Jay-Z announced 32 tour dates across North America.

Set list 
This set list is representative of the show on November 3, 2017 in Phoenix. It does not represent all concerts for the duration of the tour.

 "Kill Jay-Z"
 "No Church in the Wild"
 "Lucifer"
 "D'Evils"
 "Heart of the City (Ain't No Love)"
 "Run This Town"
 "FuckWithMeYouKnowIGotIt"
 "Beach Is Better"
 "4:44"
 "Bam"
 "Jigga My Nigga"
 "Izzo (H.O.V.A.)"
 "Dirt off Your Shoulder"
 "On to the Next One"
 "I Just Wanna Love U (Give It 2 Me)"
 "Public Service Announcement"
 "99 Problems"
 "Big Pimpin'"
 "The Story of O.J."
 "Niggas in Paris"
 "Where I'm From"
 "Empire State of Mind"
 "Blues Freestyle"
 "Hard Knock Life (Ghetto Anthem)"
 "Smile"
Encore
"Numb/Encore"

Shows

References 

2017 concert tours
Jay-Z concert tours